The Suditi Global Academy is an English medium residential cum day scholar coeducational school, located in District Mainpuri of Uttar Pradesh. The school was founded in 2009. It is affiliated with the Central Board of Secondary Education (CBSE), New Delhi.

References

External links 
 

High schools and secondary schools in Uttar Pradesh
Private schools in Uttar Pradesh
Boarding schools in Uttar Pradesh
Mainpuri district
Educational institutions established in 2009
2009 establishments in Uttar Pradesh